The BL 6-inch Mk XXII gun was a British high-velocity 6-inch 50-calibre wire-wound naval guns deployed on the Nelson-class battleships from the 1920s to 1945.

Background 
They were originally designed as secondary armament for the proposed G3 class battlecruisers. When the G3 class were cancelled after the Washington Naval Treaty the guns and mountings were later used as secondary armament on the two Nelson-class battleships, serving throughout World War II. The Mk VIII gun mountings could elevate from +60 degrees to -5 degrees, while the telescopic power rammers for the gun loaded at a +5-degree fixed angle. Although classified as a dual-purpose gun and capable of high-angle fire, their training and elevation speeds were too slow for the anti-aircraft role and their main use was against surface targets.

Ammunition 
The gun originally fired a  shell, which had been the standard shell weight for six-inch guns since 1880. From 1942 the gun fired the same  shell introduced for the later Mk XXIII gun. Figures in the table below are for the 100lb shell.

Shell trajectory

See also

Weapons of comparable role, performance and era 
 152 mm /53 Italian naval gun Models 1926 and 1929 approximate Italian equivalent deployed on light cruisers
 6"/53 caliber gun : roughly equivalent US gun deployed on light cruisers

Notes

References

Bibliography

External links 

 Tony DiGiulian, British 6"/50 (15.2 cm) BL Mark XXII

 

Naval guns of the United Kingdom
World War II naval weapons of the United Kingdom
152 mm artillery